L.627 is a 1992 French film directed by Bertrand Tavernier.

Plot
Lucien Marguet, nicknamed "Lulu" is an investigator of the second class in the judicial police in the Paris head office. He is a field officer, so passionate about his work that he sometimes sacrifices his family responsibilities with his wife, a doctor, and his ailing mother. After his superior cancels a drug stakeout so he can use the stakeout van to drive home, even though he has been drinking, Lulu shows his contempt for him in front of their colleagues and is thrown out of the brigade.

After a period dealing with minor public complaints in one suburban police precinct, he joins a suburban police team fighting drug trafficking. The film covers their operations, their relationships with colleagues and informants, and the challenge of working with insufficient equipment and supplies. Lulu is obsessed with getting results: others on the team are more interested in slacking off and enjoying themselves. He has few close acquaintances apart from a prostitute who is HIV positive and a drug addict whose prospects are limited.

Cast

 Didier Bezace as Lucien 'Lulu' Marguet
 Jean-Paul Comart as Dodo
 Charlotte Kady as Marie
 Jean-Roger Milo as Manuel
 Nils Tavernier as Vincent
 Philippe Torreton as Antoine
 Lara Guirao as Cécile
 Cécile Garcia-Fogel as Kathy Marguet
 Claude Brosset as Adore
 Frédéric Pierrot as René
 François Levantal as Inspector
 Patrick Rocca as Inspector Caron

 Hervé Laudière as Inspector Biere
 Jacques Boudet as Raymond
 Fabrice Roux as Toulouse
 Jean-Luc Abel as J.P.
 Martial as Rambo
 Jacky Pratoussy as Mario
 Didier Castello as Willy
 Eric Dufay as Mr. Propre
 François Lescurat as Usher
 Eric Savin as Lefort
 Jean Odoutan as Mamadou Diop
 Jean-Claude Calon as Longuet

 Kamel Cherif as Said
 Bruno Raffaelli as Jaunet
 Jean Le Mouël as Aussenac
 Laurentine Milebo as Alimata
 Simone Pheto as Couliba
 Shérif Scouri as Norrodine
 Smaïl Mekki as Miloud
 Fathia Saïd as Malika
 Thierry Desroses as Saintonge
 Joséphine Kouam as Joséphine
 Isabelle Soimaud as Philomene
 Uche Aniagolu as Berthe

Accolades

References

External links

1992 films
1992 crime drama films
French crime drama films
1990s French-language films
Films directed by Bertrand Tavernier
Films scored by Philippe Sarde
1990s French films